Heereman von Zuydwyck is a surname. Notable people with this surname include:

 Clemens Heereman von Zuydwyck (1832–1903), German farmer, forrester and politician (Centrum)
 Constantin Heereman von Zuydtwyck (1931–2017), German farmer, forester and politician (CDU)
 Sylvester Heereman van Zuydtwyck (born 1974), German roman-catholic vicar

German-language surnames